HMCS Jolliet is a Canadian Forces Naval Reserve Division (NRD) located in Sept-Îles, Quebec. Dubbed a stone frigate, HMCS Jolliet is a land-based naval training establishment crewed by part-time sailors and also serves as a local recruitment centre for the Canadian Forces Naval Reserve. It is one of 24 naval reserve divisions located in major cities across Canada.

Namesake 
HMCS Jolliet is named after French-Canadian explorer known for a number of discoveries in North America, including discovering the Mississippi River.

History 
HMCS Jolliet was established on 7 October 1989 in an effort to expand the presence of the Royal Canadian Navy in the French speaking province of Quebec. Originally housed in a former elementary school leased from the local school board, HMCS Jolliet moved its operations to a new facility on rue Arnaud in 1993.

References 

Royal Canadian Naval Reserve